Erik Andrés Moreno Serna (born 24 November 1991) is a Colombian footballer who plays as a forward.

Club career
Born in Quibdó, Chocó, Moreno finished his formation with Deportivo Pereira. He made his professional debut on 15 February 2009, starting in a 3–0 home triumph against Deportivo Cali.

In 2010, Moreno transferred to fellow first division side Millonarios. He only became a part of the first squad in the following year, being a key offensive unit during the year's Copa Colombia; he scored five goals in the tournament, as his side was crowned champions.

On 31 January 2014 Moreno moved abroad for the first time in his career, signing a -year contract with S.C. Braga. He scored his first goal for the club on 13 April, but in a 1–3 home loss against FC Porto.

On 2 September 2014 Moreno was loaned to Greek side Panetolikos, for one year. On 31 August of the following year he switched teams and countries again, after agreeing to a one-year loan deal with Real Valladolid.

References

External links

1991 births
Living people
People from Quibdó
Colombian footballers
Association football forwards
Categoría Primera A players
Categoría Primera B players
Primeira Liga players
Liga Portugal 2 players
Meistriliiga players
Esiliiga players
Super League Greece players
Segunda División players
Deportivo Pereira footballers
Millonarios F.C. players
S.C. Braga players
S.C. Braga B players
Panetolikos F.C. players
Real Valladolid players
Cúcuta Deportivo footballers
C.D. Tondela players
U.D. Oliveirense players
FCI Levadia Tallinn players
Colombian expatriate footballers
Colombian expatriate sportspeople in Estonia
Colombian expatriate sportspeople in Greece
Colombian expatriate sportspeople in Portugal
Colombian expatriate sportspeople in Spain
Expatriate footballers in Estonia
Expatriate footballers in Greece
Expatriate footballers in Portugal
Expatriate footballers in Spain
Sportspeople from Chocó Department